New Tolsta is a village on the Isle of Lewis in the Outer Hebrides, Scotland. New Tolsta is within the parish of Stornoway, and it lies to the north of North Tolsta, at the end of the B895 road.

To the north of the village lies the beginning of a road that was planned to cross the moor and meet the road end in the village of Skigersta in Ness. The uncompleted project is known locally as "the road to nowhere".

References

External links

Canmore - Lewis, New Tolsta
Canmore - Lewis, New Tolsta, Black House site record

Villages in the Isle of Lewis